Lexow may refer to:

Clarence Lexow who headed the Lexow Committee
Charles K. Lexow, early 20th century New York politician